Chéri is a novel by Colette published in France in 1920. The title character's true name is Fred Peloux, but he is known as Chéri to almost everyone, except, usually, to his wife. This novel was followed by a sequel, La Fin de Chéri, published in 1926.

Plot summary
The novel opens with an exchange between Léa and Chéri. They are physically involved, and they argue while Chéri plays with Léa's pearls and thinks on her age. He mentions his marriage prospects, but she seems to take this in stride as they believe their relationship is casual. They have been involved for around six years, and she is forty-nine while he is twenty-five. Léa alternatingly obsesses over getting old and celebrates what she has done and who she has had in her life while demonstrating no remorse over her life as a courtesan.  As they often do, the pair playfully fight before making up, and he runs off to meet his potential bride, Edmée. Edmée is revealed to be a reticent girl with a boisterous, rude mother (Marie-Laure).

At this point, there are flashbacks through the course of their relationship. Léa considers Chéri's mother, Charlotte, a competitor but she also appears to be one of her closest friends. When Chéri was nineteen, Léa mentioned taking a trip to the country.  She and Chéri argue a little, kiss and make up, and travel together to Normandy where they stay for several months as lovers. At times she thinks that he is so distant, he might as well speak another language. After attempting to have him trained in boxing, the text flashes forward to a more recent time.

Chéri is telling Léa of his upcoming marriage to Edmée and is disappointed by her lack of response. Notably, his mother and Edmée's mother are at war over the couple's future financial arrangements. After their marriage, Chéri is notably depressed.  Léa takes her leave without telling anyone where she is going or when she will come back. Chéri does not take this news well and wishes constantly to know more while reflecting on the shocking youth of his young (nineteen year old) bride and comparing her with Léa.

After an argument with Edmée, Chéri goes for a late night walk and eventually ends up with a friend, Desmond. He has Desmond call his house for him and tell them first that he is having dinner and then that he is staying with Desmond for the night. He does not return home for months though. In this time period, he repeatedly thinks of going home or of divorce, yet he does neither. He pays Desmond for his services, yet he never actually sleeps with the women or does the drugs that are provided. In his absence, Edmée writes him to say that she will wait at their home for further instructions.

After having been gone for six and a half months, Léa returns. This spurs Chéri to buy apology gifts and actually return home to his young wife (who happily accepts his return after his three months' absence). It is revealed that Léa had some lovers while she was away; however, she seems uninterested in most of her old habits once she has returned to Paris. Realizing she is being ridiculous, she begins trying to make plans to keep her mind from her longing for Chéri.

Not long afterward, Chéri turns up on Léa's doorstep and she lets him in. He declares he is here to stay and they realize their relationship was one of love. They have sex that night. After awakening, she begins to plan for them to escape Paris discreetly together; however, there seem to be some prior feelings that they cannot move beyond.

They begin to argue, and he must remind her of what a kind woman she typically is and how she is supposed to care for others. He admits that he has been obsessed with seeing her again and could not move past her. Although this may be true, in the light of morning, he sees how she has aged tremendously and realizes that the Léa he longed for is gone. Heartbroken, she thanks him for finding her beautiful and worthy for so long.  She says he should blame her for all that is wrong with him, and sends him home to his wife despite longing to do otherwise. As he walks away, she excitedly thinks he may turn around; however, he does not. The novel ends with his back to her as he leaves and him filling his lungs with air the way an escaped convict might.

English translations 

 Chéri and The Last of Chéri, trans. Roger Senhouse (Farrar, Straus & Giroux, 1951)
 Chéri and The End of Chéri, trans. Rachel Careau (Norton, 2022)
 Chéri and The End of Chéri, trans. Paul Eprile (New York Review Books, 2022)

Adaptations

The novel has been adapted to film twice, in 1950 and 2009; and television twice, in 1962 and 1973.

The ballet of Chéri premiered at the Edinburgh Festival in September 1980. The ballet was choreographed by Peter Darrell, while the music was composed by David Earl. The ballet was danced by the Scottish Ballet with the lead roles of Léa and Chéri danced by Patrick Bissell and Galina Samsova. The set was designed by Philip Prowse. This ballet was revived by the Hong Kong Ballet in 1989.

Chéri (the film)
The novel has been adapted to the silver screen by Stephen Frears in 2009, with Rupert Friend as the young Chéri and Michelle Pfeiffer as Léa. Christopher Hampton wrote the screenplay.

References

External links
 
 Cheri the film

1920 French novels
French novels adapted into films
French romance novels
Novels by Colette
Novels set in France
French novels adapted into television shows
Novels adapted into ballets